Suárez Cabinet may refer to:

 First Suárez Cabinet, the Spanish government led by Adolfo Suárez from 1976 to 1977
 Second Suárez Cabinet, the Spanish government led by Adolfo Suárez from 1977 to 1979
 Third Suárez Cabinet, the Spanish government led by Adolfo Suárez from 1979 to 1981